Oleg Borisovich Lapshin (born October 18, 1937) is a retired Russian professional football coach. Lapshin was the coach of Russia from 1992 to 1994.

References

1937 births
People from Moscow
Russian football managers
Female association football managers
Soviet football managers
Russia women's national football team managers
Russian State University of Physical Education, Sport, Youth and Tourism, Department of Chess alumni
Living people